is a Japanese drama special based on the novel of the same name by Tokuya Higashigawa and directed by Yuichi Sato. It received a viewership rating of 13.9%.

Plot
Shotaro Tarui is an ordinary 29-year-old man who came to Tokyo 7 years ago, pursuing his childhood dream of becoming a hero. However, he now simply gets by as a part-time worker and has just lost his latest part-time job. The unexpected story unfolds as he finds himself planning a fake kidnapping after he suddenly receives a request from the daughter of a yakuza boss, Erika Hanazono.

Cast

Main cast
 Satoshi Ohno as Shotaro Tarui 
 Yui Aragaki as Erika Hanazono 
 Maki Shinta as young Erika Hanazono
 Ryuta Sato as Kazuki Komoto 
 Shihori Kanjiya as Satsuki Hanazono 
 Hiroki Narimiya as Seiji Yamabe
 Masahiro Takashima as Takashi Kuroki
 Shota Yasuda as Kota Shiraishi
 Ryo Kimura as Shuhei Hirato
 Tokio Emoto as Toshiaki Kanda
 Sayaka Yamaguchi as Junko Tatsukawa 
 Akiyoshi Nakao as Yuki Kato
 Kokoro Kuge as Shiori Arai
 Katsumi Takahashi as Tadao Yasukawa
 Jun Kaname as Yuya Takazawa
 Kinya Kitaoji as Shugoro Hanazono

Guest appearances
 Sho Sakurai as Kageyama (from Nazotoki wa Dinner no Ato de)
 Jun Matsumoto as Shuntaro Tokita (from Lucky Seven)
 Saki Fukuda as Shotaro's elementary school teacher
 Naoto Takenaka as Sliderman
 Katsuhisa Namase as the manager of the Hero Show
 Kei Tanaka as Youth A
 Yoji Tanaka as a barista
 Sumie Sasaki as a grocery shopkeeper
 Takashi Ukaji as a ramen shopkeeper
 Megumi Yokoyama as Mayuko Arai/Erika's mother
 Ikkei Watanabe as Kenjiro Takemura
 Kunihiro Matsumura as Hanazono's deliveryman
 Nobuhiko Takada as a bicycle courier

References

External links

2012 Japanese television series debuts
Fuji TV dramas
2012 television specials
Japanese television specials
Television shows based on Japanese novels